Znamensky District is the name of several administrative and municipal districts in Russia.
Znamensky District, Omsk Oblast, an administrative and municipal district of Omsk Oblast
Znamensky District, Oryol Oblast, an administrative and municipal district of Oryol Oblast
Znamensky District, Tambov Oblast, an administrative and municipal district of Tambov Oblast

References

it:Znamenskij rajon
ru:Знаменский район